Ali Bongo Ondimba (born Alain Bernard Bongo; 9 February 1959), sometimes known as Ali Bongo, is a Gabonese politician who is the third and current president of Gabon since October 2009.

Ali Bongo is the son of Omar Bongo, who was President of Gabon from 1967 until his death in 2009. During his father's presidency, he was Minister of Foreign Affairs from 1989 to 1991, represented Bongoville as a Deputy in the National Assembly from 1991 to 1999, and was Minister of Defense from 1999 to 2009. After his father's death, he won the 2009 Gabonese presidential election. He was reelected in 2016, in elections marred by numerous irregularities, arrests, human rights violations and post-election protests and violence. Bongo is also president of the Gabonese Democratic Party.

Early life and career

Birth
Ali Bongo was born Alain Bernard Bongo in Brazzaville, as the son of Albert-Bernard Bongo (later Omar Bongo Ondimba) and Josephine Kama (later Patience Dabany). His mother was 18 years old at the time of his birth. He was conceived 18 months before Albert-Bernard's marriage and there have been rumors of his being Bongo's adopted son, a claim that he dismisses.

Education and music career
Bongo was educated at a private school in Neuilly, France, and then studied law at the Sorbonne. In 2018, he received an honorary doctorate of law degree from Wuhan University in China. In 1977, he released a funk album, A Brand New Man, produced by Charles Bobbit.

Early political career
After graduating from his law course, he entered politics, joining the Gabonese Democratic Party (abbreviated PDG) in 1981; he was elected to the PDG Central Committee at the party's Third Extraordinary Congress in March 1983. Subsequently, he was his father's Personal Representative to the PDG and in that capacity he entered the PDG Political Bureau in 1984. He was then elected to the Political Bureau at an ordinary party congress in September 1986.

Bongo held the post of High Personal Representative of the President of the Republic from 1987 to 1989. In 1989, his father appointed him to the government as Minister of Foreign Affairs and Cooperation, replacing Martin Bongo. He was considered a reformist within the ruling PDG in the early 1990s. In the 1990 parliamentary election (the first election after the introduction of multiparty politics), he was elected to the National Assembly as a PDG candidate in Haut-Ogooué Province. After two years as Foreign Minister, a 1991 constitutional amendment setting a minimum age of 35 for ministers resulted in his departure from the government.

Following his departure from the government, Bongo took up his seat as a Deputy in the National Assembly in 1991. In February 1992, he organized a visit by American pop singer Michael Jackson to Gabon.

Bongo became President of the Higher Council of Islamic Affairs of Gabon (Conseil supérieur des affaires islamiques du Gabon, CSAIG) in 1996. Prior to the December 1996 parliamentary election, a supporter of Defense Minister Idriss Ngari challenged Bongo for the PDG nomination to his parliamentary seat, but Bongo was successful in winning the nomination and retaining the seat. In surviving that challenge, he benefited from the assistance of his maternal uncle Jean-Boniface Assélé, one of his key political allies. After over seven years as a Deputy, Bongo was appointed to the government as Minister of National Defense on 25 January 1999.

In the December 2001 parliamentary election, Bongo was elected to the National Assembly as a PDG candidate in Haut-Ogooué Province. At the PDG's Eighth Ordinary Congress in July 2003, he was elected as a vice-president of the PDG. During the 2005 presidential election, he worked on his father's re-election campaign as Coordinator-General of Youth. Following that election, he was promoted to the rank of Minister of State on 21 January 2006, while retaining the defense portfolio.

Bongo was re-elected to the National Assembly in the December 2006 parliamentary election as a PDG candidate in Haut-Ogooué Province. He retained his post as Minister of State for National Defense after that election, although he was subsequently reduced to the rank of ordinary Minister on 28 December 2007. At the PDG's Ninth Ordinary Congress in September 2008, he was re-elected as a vice-president of the PDG.

Election and presidency

Omar Bongo died at a Spanish hospital on 8 June 2009. Ali Bongo appeared on television that night to call "for calm and serenity of heart and reverence to preserve the unity and peace so dear to our late father".

Having been appointed to key positions by his father, it was widely considered likely that he would emerge as his father's successor following the latter's death in June 2009. Some press reports predicted a power struggle, however, suggesting that a "fierce rivalry" existed between Bongo and his sister Pascaline, who was Director of the Presidential Cabinet. The degree of support for Ali Bongo within the PDG leadership was also questioned in the press, and it was argued that many Gabonese "see him as a spoilt child, born in Congo-Brazzaville, brought up in France, hardly able to speak indigenous languages and with the appearance of a hip hop star".

Bongo was one of ten candidates who submitted applications to become the PDG's candidate in the early presidential election, scheduled for 30 August 2009. PDG Deputy Secretary-General Angel Ondo announced on 16 July that the party leadership had chosen Bongo by consensus as the PDG candidate, although this decision still needed to be formally confirmed at a party congress. An extraordinary PDG congress accordingly designated Bongo as the party's candidate on 19 July. On that occasion, he thanked delegates for their choice, saying he was "aware of the legitimate concerns" of the people; he vowed to battle corruption and "redistribute the proceeds of economic growth" as president.

Despite standing as a presidential candidate, Bongo was retained as Minister of Defense in the government appointed on 22 July 2009. Rogombé urged calm and called for the candidates to be "worthy" of the votes they would receive. The opposition strongly protested Bongo's continued inclusion in the government. After Interim President Rose Francine Rogombé said that Bongo would be replaced so that all candidates would be on an equal footing for the election, Interior Minister Jean-François Ndongou was appointed to take over from Bongo as Minister of Defense in an interim capacity when the election campaign officially began on 15 August 2009.

A few days after the election on 30 August 2009, it was announced that he had won the election with 42% of the vote, and that result was promptly confirmed by the Constitutional Court. The opposition rejected the official results, and riots broke out in Gabon's second largest city, Port-Gentil. In response to allegations of fraud, the Constitutional Court conducted a recount before again declaring Bongo the winner with 41.79% of the vote on 12 October 2009; he was then sworn in as president on 16 October. Various African presidents were present for the ceremony. Bongo expressed a commitment to justice and the fight against corruption at the ceremony and said that fast action was needed to "give back confidence and promote the emergence of new hope". He also alluded to his father's governing philosophy of preserving stability through regional, tribal, and political balance in the allocation of power, while also stressing that "excellence, competence and work" were even more important than "geographical and political considerations". Later in the day, he announced the reappointment of Paul Biyoghe Mba as Prime Minister; he made the announcement personally "to underline the importance of this moment". According to Bongo, Biyoghe Mba had the necessary experience and managerial competence "to lead us through the next stage", and he said work would start "immediately".

The composition of Biyoghe Mba's new government was announced on 17 October; it was reduced to only 30 ministers, thereby fulfilling Bongo's campaign promise to reduce the size of the government and thereby reduce expenses. The government was also mostly composed of new faces, including many technocrats, although a few key ministers, such as Paul Toungui (Foreign Minister), Jean-François Ndongou (Interior Minister), and Laure Olga Gondjout (Communications Minister), retained their posts.

On 9 June 2011, Ali Bongo and Barack Obama met at the White House.

In 2012, clashes between the supporters of opposition figure André Mba Obame and police occurred in Libreville.

On 17 August 2015, Bongo announced that he planned to donate everything he inherited from his father to the young people of Gabon, in the form of "a foundation for the youth and education". Explaining his decision, he said that "we are all heirs of Omar Bongo Ondimba" and that "no Gabonese must be left by the side of the road".

Gabon's economy continues to be based on a rent strategy, being entirely devoted to the production and export of natural resources. Many difficulties persist in addition: unemployment rate around 30% of the active population in 2016, expeditious arrests during student or union demonstrations (numerous since January 2016), deterioration of access to health care (a deposit of 300,000 CFA francs is now required to enter the hospital), deficiency of public services, recurrent electricity cuts. More than half of the population is below the poverty line.

On 24 October 2018, Bongo was hospitalized in Riyadh for an undisclosed illness. On 29 November 2018 Bongo was transferred to a military hospital in Rabat to continue recovery. On 9 December 2018 it was reported by Gabon's Vice President Moussavou that Bongo suffered a stroke in Riyadh and has since left the hospital in Rabat and is currently recovering at a private residence in Rabat. From 24 October 2018 to 1 January 2019, Bongo was not seen in public, leading to rampant speculation about the possibility that he may have died or otherwise become incapacitated. On 1 January 2019, Bongo gave his first public address via a video posted to social media since falling ill in October 2018 quashing rumors of his death. Despite this, many anti-Bongo activists living abroad questioned the legitimacy of the video with some claiming that the man giving the address was not Bongo, but a body double. In August 2019, Bongo made his first public appearance since his stroke.

On 7 January 2019, soldiers in Gabon launched a coup d’etat attempt. The coup attempt failed, and the government successfully re-asserted control. The coup may not have actually happened though, as has been reported by critics of the dictatorship, and could have been used as a tactic by the government to gain support.

As a result of Bongo's medically induced absence from politics, Gabon has witnessed the proliferation of official corruption targeting foreign-owned businesses.

In early January 2020, the Senate and National Assembly passed a constitutional reform that would allow the president to appoint one-third of senators in place of elections, among other changes.

In October 2021, Bongo was named in the Pandora Papers leak.

Family
Ali Bongo married his first wife, the French-born Sylvia Valentin, in 1989; she is the daughter of Édouard Valentin, CEO of the Omnium gabonais d'assurances et de réassurances (OGAR) insurance company. Édouard Valentin's wife Evelyne works in the secretariat of the presidency, and Édouard is Chargé des affaires sociales at the Gabonese Employers Confederation (Confédération patronale gabonaise, CPG). In 1994 Ali Bongo married his second wife, American , from Los Angeles, California; at the time of Ali Bongo's election as president, Inge Bongo was living on food stamps in California, and she later filed for divorce in 2015.

He has four children—one daughter, Malika Bongo Ondimba, and three sons, Noureddin Bongo Valentin, Jalil Bongo Ondimba and Bilal Bongo—whom he and Sylvia adopted in 2002.

See also
André Mba Obame

References

External links

Official site of Ali Bongo
2004 photograph of Ali Bongo (People's Daily)
GABON: Who will succeed Omar Bongo?, IRIN News, 11 February 2005

|-

1959 births
Converts to Islam
Defence ministers of Gabon
Foreign ministers of Gabon
Gabonese Democratic Party politicians
Gabonese lawyers
Gabonese Muslims
Living people
People from Brazzaville
Presidents of Gabon
Children of national leaders
20th-century politicians
21st-century Gabonese politicians
People named in the Pandora Papers
21st-century Gabonese people